William Henry Barnes (c. 1840 or 1845-December 24, 1866) was an African American Union Army soldier during the American Civil War and a recipient of the Medal of Honor, America's highest military decoration.

Biography
Barnes was born and raised in St. Mary's County Maryland and worked as a free tenant farmer there before enlisting in the Army from Norfolk, Virginia, on February 11, 1864. He joined as a private into Company C of the 38th United States Colored Infantry Regiment. His enlistment papers record his age as 23, implying a birth year of 1840 or 1841, but other sources give his birth as 1845.

At the Battle of Chaffin's Farm, on September 29, 1864, Barnes' regiment was among a division of black troops assigned to attack the center of the Confederate defenses at New Market Heights. The defenses consisted of two lines of abatis and one line of palisades manned by Brigadier General John Gregg's Texas Brigade. The attack was met with intense Confederate fire; over fifty percent of the black troops were killed, captured, or wounded. Barnes was awarded the Medal of Honor for being "[a]mong the first to enter the enemy's works; although wounded." His medal was issued six months after the battle, on April 6, 1865, and he was promoted to Sergeant another three months later, on July 1, 1865.

Barnes remained in the Army after the war, traveling to Texas with his regiment. He died of tuberculosis at an Army hospital in Indianola on December 24, 1866. A marker in his memory was placed in San Antonio National Cemetery, San Antonio, Texas.

Medal of Honor citation
Rank and organization: Private, Company C, 38th U.S. Colored Troops. Place and date: At Chaffins Farm, Va., September 29, 1864. Entered service at:------. Birth: St. Marys County, Md. Date of issue April 6, 1865.

Citation:
Among the first to enter the enemy's works; although wounded.

United States Colored Troops Memorial Statue

William H. Barnes is specifically honored and memorialized by the United States Colored Troops Memorial Statue in Lexington Park, Maryland (in St. Mary's County, where he grew up and also worked as a farmer). The informational kiosk at the memorial mentions him specifically.

See also

List of American Civil War Medal of Honor recipients: A–F
Melvin Claxton and Mark Puls, Uncommon valor : a story of race, patriotism, and glory in the final battles of the Civil War, (Wiley, 2006)

Notes

References

External links

1840s births
1866 deaths
People from St. Mary's County, Maryland
African Americans in the American Civil War
United States Army Medal of Honor recipients
19th-century deaths from tuberculosis
Union Army soldiers
People of Virginia in the American Civil War
People of Maryland in the American Civil War
Tuberculosis deaths in Texas
American Civil War recipients of the Medal of Honor